Harmen Blok was a Dutch mechanical engineer. He was best known for his work in the field of tribology.

Early life and education 
Blok was born on 8 September 1910 in Amsterdam. He was the son of Pieter Engel Johannes Blok and Wikje Harmina Poort.

He graduated with a degree in mechanical engineering from Delft University of Technology in 1932.

He died on 16 August 2000 in The Hague.

Research 
After graduating from the Delft University of Technology, and a short period as research assistant, Harmen Blok joined the Delft Laboratory of the Royal Dutch Shell Group in 1933, to work on the fundamentals of lubrication. He left Shell in 1951 to take up a position as Professor of Mechanical Engineering at Delft University of Technology. Here, along with Professor Boerlage, he developed the now ubiquitous four-ball wear tester. One of his key contributions was the prediction of flash temperature rise inside rubbing contacts. He also worked on thin-film fluid lubrication and gear tribology. 

He was a Fellow of the American Society Mechanical Engineers and the Institution of Mechanical Engineers. In 1973, he was awarded the Tribology Gold Medal from the Institution of Mechanical Engineers.

He was a founding member of the International Tribology Council (ITC).

References 

 

Tribologists
1910 births
Year of death missing